Sándor Rácz (17 March 1933 – 30 April 2013) was a Hungarian politician.

Rácz was born in Hódmezővásárhely, and represented the FKGP.   He was a famous veteran of the Hungarian Revolution of 1956.  He died, aged 80, in Budapest.

References

External links
 István Elek: Rendszerváltoztatók húsz év után, Magyar Rádió Zrt. és Heti Válasz Lap- és Könyvkiadó Kft., 2009. p. 162–169.

1933 births
2013 deaths
Independent Smallholders, Agrarian Workers and Civic Party politicians
Hungarian anti-communists
People from Hódmezővásárhely
People of the Hungarian Revolution of 1956